Squirrel Systems is a Burnaby-based point of sale vendor specializing in hospitality management systems. Squirrel is based in Burnaby, Canada.

History
Squirrel Systems was founded in 1984, and released the first restaurant point of sale system to use an integrated diskless touchscreen terminal for order management. Originally a wholly owned subsidiary of Sulcus Hospitality Technologies Corporation, in 1998 Sulcus merged with Eltrax Systems, Incorporated (Nasdaq SmallCap: ELTX). Squirrel is currently a wholly owned subsidiary of Marin Investments Ltd.

Squirrel Workstation
One of the unique characteristics of Squirrel's original product was the use of hardened LCD touchscreen terminals. Unlike other systems that used keyboards and CRT monitors, Squirrel terminals had no moving parts and were easily adapted to any operating environment. The original Squirrel terminals reached over 35,000 installed units worldwide, and was the first to integrate an LCD panel, credit card reader, employee ID reader, and CPU inside a single unit. Later units would incorporate IP connectivity, remote booting of a customized Linux operating system, and a Java virtual machine.

Squirrel Embedded Linux
In 1998 Squirrel Systems released Squirrel Embedded Linux (SEL), a customized distribution of Linux for "thin client" terminal architecture. SEL has several characteristics that were unique at the time of development, including primary support for diskless workstations, customized high-volume touchscreen drivers, integrated Java virtual machine with hardware control, and two-stage booting from a Windows server.

Industry awards

 In 2010, O'Charley's named Squirrel as its Enterprise Support Partner of the Year at the annual Inukshuk Business Partner Awards.
 Squirrel Systems was awarded the 2009 Epson Envision Award for Innovation for its Squirrel in a Box product.
 Squirrel Systems was awarded the 1999 Independent Cash Register Dealers Association Silver Award for Outstanding Sponsor in Systems/Software.
 In 1998, Squirrel was the third recipient of the Microsoft Retail Application Developer award at the HITEC Show in Los Angeles. Microsoft recognized SquirrelONE as the first application to integrate Java, Microsoft SQL Server, and Windows NT in the retail market.

References

Further reading

 Shift4 and Squirrel Systems Partner to Offer Payment Solution to the Hospitality Industry. - Entertainment Close-up | HighBeam Research
 Squirrel One and Merchant Link Integrate Solutions - Wireless News | HighBeam Research
 Payment Software from Squirrel Systems Certified by NetSPI as Compliant with Latest PA-DSS Standard. - Information Technology Newsweekly | HighBeam Research

External links
 

Technology companies of Canada
Companies based in Burnaby
Computer hardware companies
Companies established in 1984
Diskless workstations
Point of sale companies
1984 establishments in British Columbia